Martin Novoselac (born 10 November 1950) is a Croatian former footballer who played as a defender.

Playing career

Club
Novoselac began his career at Second League club Dinamo Vinkovci, but in 1972 he moved Yugoslav First League club Vojvodina Novi Sad where he impressed so quickly, he earned a spot on the SFR Yugoslavia National Team. Larger clubs soon came calling, as Croatian giants Dinamo Zagreb acquired the defender for 3 seasons before he caught the eye of Olympiacos. With the Piraeus club, Novoselac won two Greek Championships and got to showcase his skills in the European Club Championship. In 1982, he returned to his boyhood club Dinamo Vinkovci and retired from professional football two years later.

International
He made his debut for Yugoslavia in a May 1975 friendly match against the Netherlands, coming on as a 86th-minute substitute for Josip Katalinski, and earned a total of 4 caps, scoring no goals. His final international was an April 1976 friendly against Hungary.

Post-playing career
After retiring from playing the game, Novoselac established a notable career coaching and developing youth football in Croatia. For a long while, Novoselac coached the Croatia national under-21 football team, guiding them to such tournaments as the 1999 FIFA World Youth Championship and the 2004 UEFA European Under-21 Championship. Achieving significant success, Novoselac was even considered for the Croatia National Team job in 2004. Currently, he is the head of the Croatian Football Federation's youth development program.

Honours 
Vojvodina
 Mitropa Cup: 1976–77
 UEFA Intertoto Cup: 1976

Dinamo Zagreb
 Yugoslav Cup: 1979–80

Olympiacos
 Super League Greece: 1980–81, 1981–82
 Greek Cup: 1980–81

References

External links
 
 

1950 births
Living people
Sportspeople from Vinkovci
Association football defenders
Yugoslav footballers
Yugoslavia international footballers
HNK Cibalia players
FK Vojvodina players
GNK Dinamo Zagreb players
Olympiacos F.C. players
Yugoslav First League players
Super League Greece players
Yugoslav expatriate footballers
Expatriate footballers in Greece
Yugoslav expatriate sportspeople in Greece
Yugoslav football managers
Croatian football managers
HNK Cibalia managers
Croatia national under-21 football team managers
Croatia national under-19 football team managers